Westdahl may refer to:

Ferdinand Westdahl (1843-1919), an accomplished member of the United States Coast and Geodetic survey from 1867 to 1919
John Westdahl (1916-1968), American politician
SS Ferdinand Westdahl, a Liberty ship; see List of Liberty ships: A-F
USC&GS Westdahl, a survey ship of the United States Coast and Geodetic Survey in commission from 1929 to 1946
Westdahl Volcano, a volcano in the Aleutian Islands